Chuck Walker (born May 10, 1957) is an American boxer. He competed in the men's light middleweight event at the 1976 Summer Olympics. At the 1976 Summer Olympics, he lost to Jerzy Rybicki of Poland.

References

External links
 

1957 births
Living people
Light-middleweight boxers
American male boxers
Olympic boxers of the United States
Boxers at the 1976 Summer Olympics
Boxers at the 1975 Pan American Games
Pan American Games bronze medalists for the United States
Pan American Games medalists in boxing
People from Marion, Arkansas
Boxers from Arkansas
Medalists at the 1975 Pan American Games
20th-century American people